The Only Ones is the debut studio album by English power pop band The Only Ones, released in 1978 by Columbia Records. It was produced by the Only Ones themselves, with the assistance of Robert Ash and was mixed at Basing St., Escape and CBS.

The album was re-released in Europe in 2009 on Sony Music Entertainment, featuring bonus content. The reissue was a CD which comprises 13-tracks. It includes the original album digitally remastered from the original 1/2" mix tapes; alongside three bonus tracks.

Critical reception

Trouser Press called it "the best of the three original albums" in which "Perrett's languid vocals and songs provide the character and focus, while the band's skills carry it off handsomely". The album is still widely admired by British critics. In 1994, The Guinness Encyclopedia of Popular Music named The Only Ones one of the 50 best punk albums of all-time. The compilers claimed that the Only Ones were "the closest thing the UK had to Johnny Thunders' Heartbreakers, a laconic, shamble of a band who were, at moments, touched by a creative greatness that made you get out of the glare".

Since the end of the 1990s, the album has also appeared on several all-time greatest albums lists. The album was also included in the book 1001 Albums You Must Hear Before You Die.

Track listing

Personnel
The Only Ones
Peter Perrett – lead and background vocals, guitars, keyboards
John Perry – guitars, keyboards
Alan Mair – bass guitars
Mike Kellie – drums

Session musicians
Mick Gallagher – keyboards
Gordon Edwards – keyboards
Raphael & Friends – horns
Koulla Kakoulli –  backing vocals

Production team
Robert Ash – production, engineering
The Only Ones – production
Ed Hollis – various engineering
Steve Lillywhite – various engineering
John Burns – various engineering
Ian Maidman – various engineering
John Dent – mastering
Peter "Kodick" Gravelle – cover photography

Charts

References

External links

1978 debut albums
The Only Ones albums
Columbia Records albums